Patricia Tobacco Forrester (September 17, 1940 Northampton, Massachusetts – March 16, 2011 Washington, D.C.) was an American watercolorist.

Life
She graduated from Smith College with a B.A. (Phi Beta Kappa) in 1962 where she studied with Leonard Baskin, and from Yale University with a B.F.A. in 1963, and M.F.A. in 1965, where she studied with Chuck Close and Janet Fish.

She was a Guggenheim Fellow in 1967. In 1992 she was elected into the National Academy of Design as an Associate member, and became a full Academician in 1994. She won a 2005 and 2009 Artist Grant from the DC Commission on Arts and Humanities.

Her works are in the Corcoran Gallery of Art, the Smithsonian American Art Museum, the Brooklyn Museum, the Art Institute of Chicago, British Museum and the National Museum of Women in the Arts.

She lived from the sixties to 1981 in San Francisco, and moved to Washington, D.C., in 1982. She was married to Alex Forrester and Paul Ekman.

Forrester died in Washington, D.C. on March 16, 2011.

References

External links
Patricia Tobacco Forrester (1940-2011) on the Steven Scott Gallery site

1940 births
2011 deaths
20th-century American painters
21st-century American painters
People from Northampton, Massachusetts
Artists from Massachusetts
American watercolorists
Smith College alumni
Yale School of Art alumni
American women painters
20th-century American women artists
21st-century American women artists
Women watercolorists